Edward Harold Yeoman "Eddie" Robertson (also known as "Dagger") (19 December 1935 – December 1981) was a Scottish footballer who played for Bury, Wrexham and Tranmere Rovers, before moving to Ellesmere Port as player/coach. He returned to Tranmere as assistant manager and coach under John King until his death, aged 45

References

Bury F.C. players
Wrexham A.F.C. players
Tranmere Rovers F.C. players
Ellesmere Port Town F.C. players
1935 births
1981 deaths
Footballers from Edinburgh
Association football fullbacks
Scottish footballers
Linlithgow Rose F.C. players
English Football League players
Tranmere Rovers F.C. non-playing staff